Warhol superstars were a clique of New York City personalities promoted by the pop artist Andy Warhol during the 1960s and early 1970s. These personalities appeared in Warhol's artworks and accompanied him in his social life, epitomizing his famous dictum, "In the future everyone will be famous for fifteen minutes". Warhol would simply film them, and declare them "superstars".

History

The first recognised superstar was Baby Jane Holzer, whom Warhol featured in many of his early film experiments. The superstars would help Warhol generate publicity while Warhol offered fame and attention in return. Warhol's philosophies of art and celebrity met in a way that imitated the Hollywood studio system at its height in the 1930s and 1940s.

Among the best-known of Warhol's superstars was Edie Sedgwick. She and Warhol became very close during 1965 but their relationship ended abruptly early in the next year. Warhol would continue to associate himself with people including Viva, Candy Darling, Ultra Violet, Nico and International Velvet.

Warhol's studio, The Factory, played host to most of his superstars and as his experiments in film continued he became more interested in the bohemian eccentrics attracted to the studio. Some of the most important superstars to emerge from the period of the first Factory (known as the 'Silver Factory' because silver foil had been applied to the walls and ceilings) include Paul America, Ondine, Taylor Mead, Rolando Peña, Mary Woronov, Eric Emerson, Gerard Malanga, Billy Name, Brigid Berlin and Sappheo.

In the later films, made in collaboration with Paul Morrissey, Warhol brought in new superstars including Joe Dallesandro, Penny Arcade, Andrea Feldman, Jane Forth, Geraldine Smith, and Sylvia Miles. During this period Warhol developed an increasing fascination with trans women and drag queens, and promoted Candy Darling, Holly Woodlawn and Jackie Curtis to superstar status.

Many of the superstars were celebrated in Lou Reed's song Walk on the Wild Side.

Warhol significantly reduced his public accessibility after being shot by Valerie Solanas in 1968. The age of the Warhol superstar soon faded.

Films
The 1966 film Chelsea Girls, about life amongst the superstars at Hotel Chelsea, was notable for finding success beyond New York City underground arthouse scene.

The later Warhol/Morrissey collaborations Flesh, Trash, Heat, and Women in Revolt are more frequently screened.

List of Warhol superstars

Allen Midgette
Andrea Feldman
Benedetta Barzini
Bibbe Hansen (mother of musician Beck)
Billy Name
Brigid Berlin
Candy Darling
Cherry Vanilla
Chuck Wein
Cyrinda Foxe
Ed Hood (actor in Warhol's My Hustler)
Edie Sedgwick
Elecktrah Lobel (actress who starred in Kitchen and The Life of Juanita Castro)
Eric Emerson
Fred Herko
Gerard Malanga
Holly Woodlawn
Ingrid Superstar
Isabelle Collin Dufresne (Ultra Violet)
Ivy Nicholson (Batman Dracula; Couch; Four Stars; I, a Man; John and Ivy)
Jack Smith
Jackie Curtis
Jane Forth
Jane Holzer
Jayne County
Joe Campbell
Joe Dallesandro
Louis Waldon (The Nude Restaurant, Lonesome Cowboys, San Diego Surf, Flesh, Blue Movie)
Mario Montez (Batman Dracula; Camp; The Chelsea Girls; Harlot; Hedy; Mario Banana; More Milk, Yvette)
Mary Woronov
Naomi Levine
Nico
Ondine
Pat Ast
Paul America
Richard Bernstein (artist who did the covers of Interview for 15 years)
Rolando Peña (also known as El Principe Negro / The Black Prince)
Ruby Lynn Reyner
Sally Kirkland
Susan Bottomly (later known as International Velvet)
Taylor Mead
Viva

References

External links
Warholstars Andy Warhol Films, Art and Superstars

American artist groups and collectives